The Driggs family is an American business family descended from Joseph Driggs of Middletown and East Haddam, Connecticut (died November 1748).

Notable members of the family
Adam Driggs (born 1965), Maricopa County Arizona Superior Court judge 
Deborah Driggs, actress, and businesswoman; Playboy Playmate for March 1990
Edmund H. Driggs (1865–1946), United States Representative from New York from 1897 to 1901
Elsie Driggs (1898–1992), painter of the 1920s and 1930s American modern-art movement, Precisionism
Frank Driggs, Great Depression-era Grammy Award-winning musician and author
H. Wayne Driggs, original scriptwriter for the Hill Cumorah Pageant, used from 1937 to 1987
Howard R. Driggs (1873–1963), prominent author, and professor at the University of Utah between 1897 and 1923, and of New York University from 1923 until 1942. He was  professor from 1942 until his death
John B. Driggs (1852–1914), medical doctor and teacher, who served at the mission station of the Episcopal Church of the United States at Point Hope, Alaska, 
Jeff Driggs (born 1961), champion clog dancer, choreographer and entertainer; 2014 inductee to the America's Clogging Hall of Fame (ACHF)
John D. Driggs (1927–2014), Mayor of Phoenix, Arizona from 1970 to 1974
John F. Driggs, United States Representative from Michigan; the first person to represent Michigan's 6th congressional district
Junius ElMarion Driggs (1907–1994), co-founder and CEO of Western Savings and Loan, which operated between 1929 and 1990); president of the Mesa Arizona Temple from 1975 to 1980
The King Sisters, a big band-era vocal group consisting of six sisters from the extended Driggs family of entertainers

Notes

References
 Driggs, Howard Roscoe, Driggs family history, University of Wisconsin - Madison, 1959

 
American families of Dutch ancestry
Political families of the United States